Shalini Vadnikatti is an Indian actress who works primarily in Kannada and Telugu-language films.

Career 
She made her Kannada debut with Plus (2015).  While working in a Tamil television series, Vadnikatti was able to get a role in Vellaiya Irukiravan Poi Solla Maatan that same year. Vadnikatti went on to star in several Kannada films including Rajaru (2017) and Mr Perfect (2017). She made her Telugu debut with Eureka (2020), a college drama.

Filmography

Film

Television

References

External links 

Living people
Actresses in Kannada cinema
Actresses in Tamil cinema
Actresses in Telugu cinema
Indian film actresses
21st-century Indian actresses
Year of birth missing (living people)